Michael Robert Marrone (born 27 January 1987) is an Australian soccer player who plays for Sturt Lions.

Club career
Marrone made his professional debut on 18 December 2008 in the FIFA Club World Cup fifth-placed match against Al Ahly. He came off the bench in the 54th minute to replace Daniel Mullen.

Adelaide United (2008–10)
On 25 January 2009, he made his A-League debut for Adelaide United against the Central Coast Mariners.

On 3 March 2009, Marrone was signed to a full senior contract for Adelaide after having played for their youth squad. He played 26 games for Adelaide United before signing with the new team Melbourne Heart.

Melbourne Heart
On 30 April 2010, it was announced that Marrone had signed with new A-League club Melbourne Heart for two years. He has played regularly at right back for the new club, and missed only one game in their inaugural season, which was the third Melbourne derby. In the fourth round of the season, he scored an own goal for Heart, in a match which was to end up a 2–2 draw with Perth Glory.

After the end of his first season with Melbourne Heart, Marrone travelled to the United Kingdom to partake in trials with British clubs Queens Park Rangers, Charlton Athletic and Celtic, and also played in a friendly match for Leicester City against West Bromwich Albion on 24 March 2011. He also attracted interest from Italian Serie A side Cagliari.

Adelaide United (2014–2021)
On 3 February 2014, it was announced that Marrone was signed to return to Adelaide United, after a spell with Chinese club Shanghai Shenxin. After working his way into the starting line-up, he fractured two leg bones in a match against his former club Melbourne Heart on 4 April 2014.

On 21 November 2017, Marrone was sent off in the 2017 FFA Cup Final in the 115th minute by tackling the ball boy who trying to waste time for Sydney FC to cap off the win leading 2–1 in extra time.

Sturt Lions (2021–Present)

On 3 August 2021, it was announced that Marrone had left Adelaide United after 7 years. On the same day he was unveiled as a Sturt Lions player. Joining the NPL SA side as a mid-season signing. Taking the number 2 shirt upon his arrival. Making his debut on the following weekend, the 7 August 2021, against Adelaide Croatia Raiders. In the 7th minute of his debut he scored with a long-range shot en route to a 4–1 victory. 

Michael scored his second goal for Sturt in Round 5 of the 2022 NPLSA season, against Adelaide Olympic FC. Capping off a remarkable turnaround in the second half, from 3-0 down the Lions came back to win 4-3, with Marrone scoring a wonder goal in the 90th minute to wrap up all three points.

International career
He received his first call-up for the full national team by coach Pim Verbeek in preparation for the match against Indonesia in Brisbane on 3 March 2010.

On 21 February 2012 he was selected to play against Saudi Arabia national football team in a World Cup qualification match.

Career statistics

Club

Notes

International

Notes

Honours 
Adelaide United
 A-League Premiership: 2015–16
 A-League Championship: 2015–16
 FFA Cup: 2014, 2018, 2019

References

External links 
 Aussie Footballers Maras to Marrone

1987 births
Living people
Soccer players from Adelaide
Para Hills Knights players
A-League Men players
Chinese Super League players
FFSA Super League players
Australian soccer players
Melbourne City FC players
Adelaide United FC players
Shanghai Shenxin F.C. players
Australian Institute of Sport soccer players
Australian people of Italian descent
Sportspeople of Italian descent
Expatriate footballers in China
Association football fullbacks
Australia international soccer players
South Australian Sports Institute soccer players